Fenitrothion (IUPAC name: O,O-dimethyl O-(3-methyl-4-nitrophenyl) phosphorothioate) is a phosphorothioate (organophosphate) insecticide that is inexpensive and widely used worldwide. Trade names include Sumithion, a 94.2% solution of fenitrothion.

Health effects

Fenitrothion at sublethal doses affected the motor movement of marsupials, and at acute dose levels it reduced the energy of birds.

In chronic (low) dose tests, unexpectedly only the lowest concentration (0.011 microgram/liter) of fenitrothion depressed the growth of an algae, though all of the chronic dose levels used were toxic in other ways to the algae.

Just half of fenitrothion's minimally effective dose altered the thyroid structure of a freshwater murrel (the snakehead fish).

Cases of non-specific encephalopathy and fatty visceral changes (Reye's syndrome) in children living in the vicinity of fenitrothion-spraying operations invoked the research described latterly in Science, and originally in The Lancet:

Further study showed that the illness was caused not by fenitrothion itself, but combinations which included the surfactants and the solvent (with or without the pesticide) clearly showed that pretreatment with these chemicals markedly increased the viral lethality in the test mice.

Resistance
In an unusual demonstration of resistance to pesticides, 8% of insects in farm fields were found to carry a symbiotic gut microbe that can metabolize and detoxify fenitrothion; after in-vitro tests showed that the microbe significantly increased the survival of fenitrothion-treated insects.

References

Further reading

External links 

Hazardous Substances Data Bank (source of data)
Inchem
Entox
Re-evaluation of Fenitrothion by the Pest Management Regulatory Agency of Canada

Acetylcholinesterase inhibitors
Organophosphate insecticides
Nitrobenzenes
Organothiophosphate esters